The Navegantes del Magallanes (Magellan Navigators), commonly known as Magallanes, are a baseball team in the Venezuelan Professional Baseball League. Based in Valencia, Magallanes has won 13 LVBP championships and two (2) Caribbean Series. It was founded on October 26 of 1917, contra viento y marea: 100 años de historia 1917-2017.

Mascot

The Capy is the official mascot of the Navegantes del Magallanes baseball team. The bird wears a navigator costume. He has a girlfriend named Lola, a very charming parrot.

Notable players

 José Altuve 
Sam Nahem (1915–2004), Major League Baseball pitcher
 Endy Chavez, MLB outfielder
 Luis Arraez, MLB infielder
 Richard Hidalgo, outfielder
 Melvin Mora, outfielder
 Carlos Garcia, aka "The Admiral", infielder
 Edgardo Alfonzo, infielder
 Alvaro Espinoza, infielder
 Elvis Andrus, infielder
 Pablo Sandoval, infielder
 Johan Santana, pitcher
 Freddy Garcia, pitcher
 Luis Raven, infielder
 Mario Lisson, infielder
 Damaso Blanco, infielder
 Luis Garcia, aka "Camaleón", infielder
 Ismael Chavez, aka "látigo" (Whip) pitcher
 Gustavo Gil,infielder

2022 Caribbean Series roster

Current Roster

References

External links
 Official site
 Viento en Popa. Non-Official site

Baseball teams in Venezuela